is a Japanese retired judoka.

Ono is regarded as one of judo's top fighters, having won three World Championships and two Olympic gold medals. He is the lightweight division's most dominant fighter, having won in every major championship he competed since 2015. Ono specializes in osoto gari (having written his masters' thesis on it) and uchimata. He is known for his classical technique and all ippon style, holding one of the highest ippon rates in judo. Ono is also one of the most searched judokas on the Internet.

Career

Breakthrough: Grand Slam Tokyo 2012
Ono cemented his place as one of judo's biggest ippon players by winning the prestigious Grand Slam in Tokyo all by ippon. He defeated Lee Shing Him, Yertugan Torenov and Khashbaataryn Tsagaanbaatar in the Round of 32, quarter-final and semi-final by ippon, and Etienne Briand by ippon and two yukos in the Round of 16. He met then reigning world champion and Olympic silver medalist Riki Nakaya in the final. Ono defeated Nakaya with a stunning ippon by osoto gari, adding to a waza-ari he scored earlier on. This would prove to be a turning point in one of the most heated rivalries in the lightweight division, with Ono breaking Nakaya's dominance in the division. The rivalry between the two Japanese fighters would go on for six years.

Grand Slam Paris 2013
Ono continued his ippon streak at the Grand Slam in Paris, where he defeated Luiz Alcaraz del Rey and Dirk Van Tichelt by ippon in the Round of 32 and quarter-final, and Ljubisa Kovacevic by ippon and yuko in the Round of 16. His run for a consecutive Grand Slam win ended in the semi-final, where he lost against Tsagaanbaatar by waza-ari. With 30 seconds on the clock, the Mongol threw Ono for waza-ari with Ono's signature uchi mata. The match was already sealed in the former's favour with two shidos against Ono. The Japanese then showed his ippon style again in the bronze medal contest against Benjamin Darbelet with an uchi mata ippon in just eight seconds.

Rise to prominence: 2013 World Championships
Ono became Japan's third lightweight champion in four years after Hiroyuki Akimoto and Nakaya at the World Championships in Rio de Janeiro. He faced off against Korea's double World Champion Wang Ki-chun in the Round of 64. Fifteen seconds into the fight, Wang attempted a drop morote seoi nage, however was unsuccessful in gaining a score. Ono countered with a juji gatame, but Wang easily escaped by lifting Ono off the ground. Wang then unsuccessfully threw Ono with the latter's single grip on his sleeve with an uchi mata. In a turn of events, Wang was controversially given four shidos to earn a hansoku make or disqualification, namely for three false attacks and breaking off a grip. He unexpectedly crashed out of the tournament in his first fight.

Ono met Neoklis Skouroumounis in his second fight, and scored a yuko early on with de ashi harai. He sealed the fight with ippon with uchi mata. Ono then faced Miklós Ungvári in the Round of 16, who had a similar fate to Wang. Ungvari picked up four shidos for a hansoku make, in the form of avoiding grips, stepping off the mat, attempting a false attack and passivity. Ono went on against Dex Elmont in the quarter-final, in which he again showed his ippon play. Ono scored first with an osoto gari to ushiro goshi for yuko. Elmont then scored a yuko to level the scores. The fight went to golden score with the fighters on equal grounds with a yuko and two shidos each. Ono defeated Elmont with a harai goshi for ippon, and was through to a semi-final against van Tichelt. Ono was ranked number 15, and van Tichelt thirteen places above him. Ono defeated him for a guaranteed medal with one of his best techniques, osoto gari, for ippon.

Ono was set against Ugo Legrand in the final. Ono attempted a double sleeve uchi mata and gained a yuko. Ono won the World title with a strong hane goshi that scored ippon, defeating Legrand. He was overwhelmed with winning the World title and was moved to tears.

Ono also won the Teams' bronze medal with Japan. In the quarter-final he faced Mirali Sharipov, and continued his dominance as a big ippon fighter by defeating the Uzbek with an osoto gari for waza-ari, and uchi mata for ippon.

2014 Grand Slam Tokyo
He lost to Hiroyuki Akimoto of Japan in the finals.

2016 Olympics

2020 Olympics
Ono won the gold medal in the 73 kg competition at the 2020 Olympics held in Tokyo, Japan.

Personal life
On 28 May 2013, Ono and four other senior male students in Tenri University’s judo club ordered younger members to slap freshmen in the face. After an investigation, on 5 September, Ono was removed from his post of captain of the club and with the other four were suspended for 30 days.

Competitive record

(as of 18 August 2021)

References

External links

 
 
 
 
 

1992 births
Living people
Japanese male judoka
World judo champions
Judoka at the 2016 Summer Olympics
Judoka at the 2020 Summer Olympics
Olympic judoka of Japan
Medalists at the 2016 Summer Olympics
Olympic medalists in judo
Olympic gold medalists for Japan
Olympic silver medalists for Japan
Judoka at the 2018 Asian Games
Asian Games gold medalists for Japan
Asian Games medalists in judo
Medalists at the 2018 Asian Games
Sportspeople from Yamaguchi Prefecture
Medalists at the 2020 Summer Olympics
21st-century Japanese people